Forest conservation is the  practice of planning and maintaining forested areas for the benefit and sustainability of future generations. Forest conservation involves the upkeep of the natural resources within a forest that are beneficial for both humans and the ecosystem. Forests provide wildlife with a suitable habitat for living along with filtering groundwater and preventing runoff.

History
Around the year 1900 in the United States, Gifford Pinchot lead a movement of conservation. Gifford Pinchot made conservation a popular word in its application to natural resources. Throughout the next two decades, forestry professions became widespread. Following World War I, forestry became a cooperation between private landowners, the states, and the federal government. On March 21, 1933, U.S. President Franklin D. Roosevelt sent a message to the United States Congress to strengthen the United States forest resources. In the following days, congress enacted the establishment of emergency conservation work. This project consisted of twenty five thousand men working on forest protection by planting trees, watershed restoration and erosion control. About 2.2 billion seedlings were planted which marked a start of conservation in the United States. In 1935, the Natural Resources Committee was created to understand, plan and use natural resources. Following World War II, the first Smokey Bear symbol appeared on a poster to represent a fire prevention cooperation. The Smokey Bear icon soon became one of the best advertisement icons in the United States. When people started to realize that the resources were not unlimited within the forests, conservation efforts began to start.

Forest types
There are many different types of forests. The many types of forests are categorized by climate and location. 98% of forest cover in the United States is natural with the remaining 2% being plantation land. 33% of the United States is made up of forests. Out of the 33% of the U.S. covered by forests, 37% make up subtropical forests. 48% make up temperate forests. The remaining 15% consist of boreal forests.

Boreal
Boreal forests are found in the northern regions of the United States. Canada is made up of boreal forests. These forests have long cold winters and short cool summers. Precipitation can reach over 200 centimeters per year, typically in the form of snow. Because of the cold climate in the boreal forests, the growing season is three months long. Boreal forests are made up of evergreen trees, mosses, and lichens. Mosses are a plant species that thrive in areas that are moist. Mosses can tolerate dry periods as well by holding water and moisture in the dead leaves and cells. Lichens are organisms in the form of fungal filaments. Algae is a form of lichen in the boreal forests.

Temperate
Temperate forests are forests with high levels of precipitation. The yearly precipitation rate is between 20 and 60 inches in the form of rain or snow. Temperatures in temperate forests range from -22 degrees Fahrenheit to 86 degrees Fahrenheit. Temperate Forests within the United States are found on the Eastern region. Temperate forests are able to support a variety of species due to the large amount of rainfall. Mosses and lichens dominate the forest floor with medium size trees above such as dogwood trees. The top canopy is covered by larger trees such as maple trees, birch trees, and walnut trees.

Sub-tropical
Subtropical forests are found in the United States along the southern border states. These forests are made up of evergreen species and deciduous species. Evergreens are plant species that retain their leaves year round while deciduous trees lose their leaves annually. The consistent warm climate along with consistent rainfall promote more plant growth than any other environment in the United States.

Forest threats
Deforestation is a threat to forests according to foresters. Deforestation is the permanent destruction of forests and woodlands. Deforestation is brought about by commercial logging, conversion of woodlands to agricultural land, and the felling of trees for firewood and building material. Commercial logging is that harvest of timber products for the profit that is gained from selling the product. Illegal logging is a threat to forests. Illegal logging is the harvest of timber for economic gain without permission. This method is a threat because it impedes plans and upkeep of a forest. Forests are lost to urban development and building projects. When forest are cleared for these reasons, it creates problems that foresters are concerned with. When heavy machinery is used to clear forests or develop land, the soil becomes compacted. When the soil is compacted, the soil particles are packed tightly together. Soil compaction results in water supply not being absorbed by tree roots and can be deadly to the growth of trees. Soil compaction also can create flooding. Compacted soil can not filter the groundwater into the soil, therefore water can build up on the surface creating flooding as a result. Species extinction is another threat to our forests. With the removal of forests, animal and plant species suffer. Animal species can not survive without the adequate needs of their lifestyle. Animals need cover, food, and safe areas for the reproduction process. Altering their environment disrupts the life cycle of animal species and they are oftentimes not able to adapt. Food sources are lost to deforestation. Animal species tend to consume plant life to maintain themselves. With the removal of forests this can result in animals not being able to find food in order to survive. Unmanaged recreational use is also a threat to forests. Unmanaged recreational use is the use of the forested lands by the public at an uncontrolled rate. As recreational use as increased among forests, foresters have noticed an increase in land management that is needed. Invasive species threaten forests ecosystems. Invasive species are any species that is not native to that ecosystem and economic harm along with harm to the environment. Invasive species cause disruptions in the function of the ecosystem. These species not only affect the plants within a forest, but they can affect the animals within an ecosystem as well. The financial impact cause by invasive species is 138 billion dollars per year with economic loss and control costs.

Techniques

Techniques of forest conservation are used to improve forested areas and to make the available resources sustainable.

Afforestation
Afforestation is a proactive method used to improve forests. Afforestation is the planting of trees for commercial purposes. The supply of wood and wood products from afforested areas has prevented the over use and destruction of natural forests. Instead of taking resources from existing natural forests, afforestation is a process used to plant trees and use them as resources instead of naturally existing forests. Afforestation occurs when the planting of trees is introduced to an area that previously had no trees. This creates habitat for wildlife, recreational areas, and commercial use while not causing harm to natural forests.

Reforestation
Reforestation is another method to sustain forests by improving existing forested areas. Reforestation is a method of planting trees in an existing forested area. This method is used in reaction to deforestation. When forests are removed without reestablishment they can be reforested by planting trees in the same area to rebuild the existing forest. The restoration of forests is considered to be crucial to fight climate change and to conserving global diversity. There are many places where reforestation is off limits such as productive croplands and cities. New forests can help cool down the climate as well as reduce the amount of carbon dioxide in the atmosphere depending on how large the area the new forests are in.

Selective logging
Selective logging is another method used to meet the needs of both the forests and humans seeking economical resources. Selective logging is the removal of trees within a stand based on size limitations. This technique allows for forest regeneration to occur between and after the selective harvest cycles.

Controlled burn
Although it can be threatening if it is not controlled, fire is a successful way to conserve forest resources. Controlled burn is a technique that is used to manage forests. Fire can be highly beneficial to the ecosystems within a forest. It renews the forest undergrowth and also stimulates the germination of tree species. In some species of trees, such as the Sequoia, seedlings remain dormant until broken by fire. As a result, these species can not reproduce without fire.

Wildland fire use 
Wildland fire use is an intentional fire with the purpose of improving the health of a forest. These fire cycles help maintain the diversity of habitats for all species in an ecosystem. These fires also save on suppression costs of fires. Suppression costs are the costs caused by wildfires that are not prescribed. Wildland fire use can help reduce tax payer costs in the immediate future too.

Laws and policies 
Policies to minimize the loss of forests and to increase public involvement, such as the National Forest Management Act (NFMA) of 1976, have been implemented in the United States. The NFMA serves to determine the parts of National Forests that can be used for certain purposes (roads and recreation) and which areas are safe from destruction. Many laws were created in the 1900s such as the Bankhead–Jones Farm Tenant Act of 1937, which guides the Secretary of Agriculture to work on programs relating to land conservation and the utilization to correct errors in land use. In turn, this act helps the control of soil erosion, reforestation, preservation of natural resources, and the protection of natural resources and ecosystems. Then, in 1960, the Multiple-Use Sustained-Yield Act was created, addressing the establishment and administration of national forests that can be sustainably used for human usage. The National Environmental Policy Act (NEPA) was created in 1970 setting a new goal for America. After decades of environmental neglect, this law was created to better the general good and conditions under which humans and nature can coexist in harmony while still satisfying the social, economic, and other needs that Americans will need in both the present and the future. In 1970, the Clean Air Act was made and as a part of an environmental law; this act creates national standards for air pollutants and regulates pollution sources. Two years later in 1972, the Clean Water Act was created setting the basic system up for regulating pollutants entering U.S. waters. Then, in 1976 the NFMA was created, amending the Forest and Rangeland Resources Planning Act of 1975 recognizing that the management of the U.S.' renewable resources has many parts to it and those parts are likely to change over time. The goal of this act is to develop and prepare a national renewable resources and programs that can be periodically reviewed and updated to meet current standards.

Advocacy groups 
The main advocacy group for United States Forests is the National Forest Foundation. This group works to build connections between people and National Forests through education, opportunities, and events.  Another group is the National Parks Conservation Association. This group's mission is to protect and better the National Park Systems in the United States for the present and for the future.  This group covers news articles, issues, ways to be involved, where to find national parks, and the impact they have made in the past century.

Wildlife management areas
State departments of natural resources and conservation develop, maintain, and manage public lands across the nation. Special regulations and rules apply on all wildlife management areas across the United States. Wildlife management areas are accessible to the public for many recreational uses. Hunters and campers enjoy the land to harvest wild game on a legal basis. Hunting is permitted on wildlife management areas but there are rules and regulations. A valid hunting license is required, and often a wildlife management area land use permit is also required. Along with public use of the wildlife management areas, State departments of natural resources provide necessary management to upkeep the land. The management techniques within a wildlife management area include developing habitat for wildlife along with conserving the natural land resources. Land resources within a wildlife management area are conserved by not allowing the harvest of tree species or alteration of the land in any way.

See also 
 List of types of formally designated forests

References

Forestry in the United States
Nature conservation in the United States
Forest conservation